Berginium was an Illyrian town, near Servitium in present-day Bosnia and Herzegovina.

References

Illyrian Language- The Cambridge Ancient History

Illyrian Bosnia and Herzegovina
Roman towns and cities in Bosnia and Herzegovina
Cities in ancient Illyria